Ricardo Alves may refer to:
Ricardo Alves (footballer, born 1991), Portuguese football defender
Ricardo Alves (footballer, born 1993), Portuguese football midfielder
Ricardo Alves (Paralympian), gold-medal winning member of the national football 5-a-side team for Brazil at the 2008 Summer Paralympics
Ricardo Alves (athlete), Portuguese track and field champion at the 100m sprint
Ricardo Azevedo (footballer) (born 2001, full name Ricardo Azevedo Alves), Swiss football midfielder